Matt Marks was a composer, musician, and founding member of the contemporary music ensemble Alarm Will Sound. In an obituary in NPR Tom Huizenga said that "Marks was known for blending humor and sincerity into his work". He is known for his operas, and musical theater works, including his post-Christian nihilist pop opera, The Little Death: Vol. 1, Mata Hari, about the famous spy (for the PROTOTYPE Festival) and Headphone Splitter, an ongoing project he described as a pop-horror miniseries.

References

American composers